Felice Albers (born 27 December 1999) is a Dutch field hockey player.

Career

Club Hockey
Albers plays club hockey for Amsterdam in the Dutch Hoofdklasse. 

In 2019, Albers was a member of the Amsterdam team that won the 47th and last EuroHockey Club Champions Cup. The team won the final 7–0 against Real Sociedad at the tournament held in Amstelveen, Netherlands.

Junior National Teams

Under–18
In 2016, Albers represented the Netherlands U–18 team at the EuroHockey Youth Championships. At the tournament, she scored one goal and won a gold medal with the team.

Under–21
Following her appearances in the national U–18 side, Albers appeared regularly in Dutch youth teams. In 2019, she debuted for the national U–21 side at the EuroHockey Junior Championship in Valencia, Spain, where she won a silver medal.

Senior National Teams

Indoor
Albers was a member of the Netherlands Indoor side at the 2018 EuroHockey Indoor Nations Championship in Prague, Czech Republic.

Outdoor
In 2019, Albers made her senior international debut in the FIH Pro League in a match against Belgium on 9 June. Three days later, in a match against New Zealand she scored her first international goal.

International Goals

References

1999 births
Living people
Dutch female field hockey players
Field hockey players at the 2020 Summer Olympics
Olympic field hockey players of the Netherlands
Olympic gold medalists for the Netherlands
Medalists at the 2020 Summer Olympics
Olympic medalists in field hockey
21st-century Dutch women